Kurt Martin Mislow (June 5, 1923 – October 5, 2017) was a German-born American organic chemist who specialized in stereochemistry.

Born in Berlin on June 5, 1923, Mislow had moved to London by 1938, after some time in Milan. With the help of his uncle Alfred Eisenstaedt, Mislow's family left London for New York City in 1940. Mislow earned a bachelor's degree in chemistry from Tulane University in 1944, and received a doctorate from the California Institute of Technology, where he was supervised by Linus Pauling. Mislow first taught at New York University, then moved to Princeton University in 1964. While at Princeton, Mislow served as Hugh Stott Taylor Professor of Chemistry and led the chemistry department from 1968 to 1974. He became a professor emeritus in 1988.

Over the course of his career, Mislow was named a Guggenheim fellow twice, in 1956 and 1974. Between 1959 and 1963, Mislow was granted the Sloan Research Fellowship. He became a member of the National Academy of Sciences in 1972, followed by fellowships in the American Academy of Arts and Sciences, granted in 1974, and the American Association for the Advancement of Science, bestowed in 1980. In 1999, Mislow was named a foreign member of the Accademia dei Lincei. The American Chemical Society honored Mislow with several awards, among them the James Flack Norris Award in Physical Organic Chemistry (1975), the William H. Nichols Medal Award (1987), and the Arthur C. Cope Scholar Award (1995).

References

1923 births
2017 deaths
Scientists from Berlin
Tulane University alumni
California Institute of Technology alumni
New York University faculty
Princeton University faculty
Sloan Research Fellows
Members of the United States National Academy of Sciences
Members of the Lincean Academy
Fellows of the American Academy of Arts and Sciences
Fellows of the American Association for the Advancement of Science
German emigrants to the United States
Stereochemists